Benesbard-e Sofla (also Romanized as Benesbard-e Soflá; also known as Benesbard-e Pā’īn and Benesarūd-e Pā’īn) is a village in Kuh Hamayi Rural District, Rud Ab District, Sabzevar County, Razavi Khorasan Province, Iran. At the 2006 census, its population was 73, in 21 families.

See also 

 List of cities, towns and villages in Razavi Khorasan Province

References 

Populated places in Sabzevar County